Slobodan Mihajlović (born 26 March 1957) is a Serbian politician. He served in the National Assembly of Serbia from 2004 to 2007 as a member of the Democratic Party (Demokratska stranka, DS).

Private career
Mihajlović was born in Kraljevo, in what was then the People's Republic of Serbia in the Federal People's Republic of Yugoslavia. He is a graduate of the University of Belgrade Faculty of Economics and worked for several years with Elektrosrbija Kraljevo, eventually rising to the position of director. In 2005, he accused former Kraljevo mayor Ljubiša Jovašević from the rival Democratic Party of Serbia (Demokratska stranka Srbije, DSS) of exerting de facto control over the utility and undermining its work.

Politician
Mihajlović became politically active in 1996 and was a prominent member of the Democratic Party's Kraljevo board by the early 2000s. He was the party's candidate for mayor of Kraljevo in a special off-year election in November 2003 and finished fifth against Radoslav Jović of the Serbian Renewal Movement (Srpski pokret obnove, SPO).

The following month, he appeared in the 232nd position (out of 250) on the DS's electoral list for the 2003 Serbian parliamentary election. The list won thirty-seven seats; he was not initially included in his party's delegation but received a mandate on 17 February 2004 as the replacement for another member who had resigned. (From 2000 to 2011, Serbian parliamentary mandates were awarded to candidates on successful lists at the discretion of the sponsoring parties or coalitions, and it was common practice for the mandates to be assigned out of numerical order. Mihajlović's position on the list – which was in any case mostly alphabetical – had no formal bearing on whether or when received a mandate.) The DS served in opposition for the parliament that followed, and Mihajlović was a member of the industry committee.

Jović resigned as mayor of Kraljevo in late 2005, and a by-election was held in February 2006 to choose his replacement. Mihajlović once again ran as the DS's candidate and finished third. He did not appear on the DS's list in the 2007 parliamentary election, and his assembly term ended in that year.

Serbia's electoral system was reformed in 2011, such that all mandates were assigned in numerical order to candidates on successful lists.  Mihaljlović received the fifth position on the DS's list for Kraljevo in the 2012 Serbian local elections and was elected to the city assembly when the list won thirteen out of seventy seats. The DS served in opposition in the term that followed. Mihajlović did not seek re-election in 2016 and has not returned to public life since this time.

Electoral record

Local (Kraljevo)

References

1957 births
Living people
Politicians from Kraljevo
Members of the National Assembly (Serbia)
Democratic Party (Serbia) politicians